Miquel Navarro (born September 29, 1945) is a Spanish sculptor, painter and contemporary poet.

Navarro has been defined as an eclectic artist with influences from postmodernism, minimalism and avant-garde.

Biography
Navarro was born in Mislata, Valencia in 1945. From 1964 to 1968 he studied painting at the San Carlos School of Fine Arts in Valencia. In 1972 he decided to abandon painting and concentrate on sculpture. However, he continued to paint. He also writes poetry.

In 1973, Navarro showed his first "Ciutat", one of his main sculptural manifestations. He mainly used fireproof materials along with terracotta and sand. Between 1975 and 1980 he exhibited his main works, such as "Pirámide" or "Els altres 75 anys de pintura valenciana" many exposition in Valencia (Valencia Architects School) and Madrid (Vandres Gallery and Ponce Gallery).

In 1980, Navarro's sculptures were exhibited at the 21st International Sculpture Conference in Washington, DC and the Institute of Contemporary Art, Los Angeles. Over the next few years, Navarro created  "Estructura urbana" (1983), "Des terrar" (1985–1986) and "Minerva Paranoica" (1989), a monumental sculpture. Many of these new sculptures contained iron.

In recent years, Navarro has exhibited in Bilbao (Galeria Colon XVI 2005) and Valencia (Institut Valencià d'Art Modern (IVAM) in 2009). His sculptures have included "Ciudad Roja" (1994), "Casco Urbano" (1999) and "L'Almassil" (2010).

His work
Navarro has borrowed from many styles, ranging from Baroque to Postmodernism and Minimalism.   One of his main contributions is the "Ciutat (city)". Navarro says:
"La ciudad es como un cuerpo y tiene discursos de las arterias, el elemento horizontal, en el caso de los elementos verticales están los muros, las torres."(following)"El cuerpo humano no utiliza arterias, venas, fluidos, corazón, centro, casco. Cuando tú defines una ciudad estás definiendo un cuerpo"

Some of Navarro's works are part of the collection of the Solomon R. Guggenheim Museum in New York City.

Awards
 Spanish National Award for Plastic Arts, 1986
 Alfons Roig Award (Valencia's Council), 1987
 C.E.O.E Arts Award, 1990
 National AECA Award, 1995
 Valencians for the 21st century Award, 2001,
 Generalitat Valenciana Distinction for the Cultural Merit, 2002
 Plastic Arts Awards" Valencianos del Mundo " (Given by Generalidad Valenciana and el Mundo newspaper ).
 International Julio Gonzalez Award, 2008
 Man of the Year, Hortanoticias, 2009.
 Academician of the Real Academia de BBAA de San Fernando, 2011

Street works
 Fuente Pública Valencia, 1986	
 Torreta (Fuente Publica) Turis (Valencia), 1989	
 Fanalet (Farola) Quart de Poblet (Valencia), 1989	
 Minerva Paranoica (Escultura) Castellón, 1989	
 Ars Longa Vita Brevis (Universidad Autonoma ) Barcelona, 1990	
 Torre del Sonido (Escultura Universidad Carlos III) Getafe (Madrid), 1992	
 Fraternitat (Escultura) Barcelona, 1992	
 Mástiles (Hotel Valencia-Palace) Valencia, 1994	
 Boca de Luna (Fuente Pública) Bruselas, 1996	
 Centinela (Hotel San Roque) Garachico (Tenerife), 1999	
 Home Guaita (Escultura) Valencia, 1999	
 Saltamontes Libando (Fuente Pública) Castellón, 1999	
Casco Industrial (Escultura) Bilbao, 1999	
 Andarin (Escultura) Gijon (Asturias), 2000	
 Oteando (Escultura) Torrelavega (Cantabria), 2000	
 Vigía (Escultura) Las Palmas de Gran Canaria, 2001	
 Cabeza con Luna Menguante Mislata (Valencia), 2002	
 La Mirada (Escultura) Vitoria-Gasteiz, 2002	
 Palera (Escultura) Málaga, 2003	
 Palas Fundición (Escultura) Ceuti (Murcia), 2003	
 El Parotet Valencia, 2006	
 Conexión (Museo Bellas Artes- Bilbao), 2007	
 Mantis (Murcia), 2008	
 Válvula con alberca (Expo Zaragoza), 2008

References

 Barañano, K. M., & Navarro, M. (1999). Miquel Navarro. Valencia: Consorci de Museus de la Comunitat Valenciana.
 Las Provincias. (n.d.). Retrieved March 9, 2016, from http://www.lasprovincias.es/temas/personajes/miquel-navarro.html
 Miquel Navarro en la colección del IVAM: Institut valencià d'art modern, November 8, 2005 – February 27, 2006. (2005). Valencia: IVAM.
 Navarro, M., & Joos, P. (2005). Miquel Navarro: Exposición. Bilbao: Galeria Colón XVI.
 Miquel Navarro. (n.d.). Retrieved May 19, 2016, from http://www.miquelnavarro.com/ Bibliography

21st-century Spanish painters
Spanish male painters
Spanish contemporary artists
1945 births
Living people
21st-century Spanish male artists